A synchronized swimming competition was held at the 1998 World Aquatics Championships, in Perth, Western Australia between 8 and 17 January 1998.

Overview
Synchronised swimming is one of four disciplines that has been contested at every World Aquatics Championships, along with swimming, diving, and water polo.  The 1998 competition was the seventh World Aquatics Championships. However, synchronised swimming is unique at the championships, in that only women compete in the discipline.  For the 1998 edition, three events were contested; solo, duet, and team routines.  The Russian team was dominant, winning the gold medal in all three events contested.  Olga Sedakova became only the fourth woman to win a gold medal in every discipline at the same championships, following Teresa Andersen in the first World Aquatics Championships in 1973, Carolyn Waldo in 1986, and Becky Dyroen-Lancer at the previous competition in 1994.  North America had their worst showing ever at the World Aquatics Championships, Canada did not win any medals in synchronised swimming for the first time ever.  The United States missed the podium in the solo and duet competitions, after winning at least one medal in those disciplines at every previous competition.

Medal table

Medal summary

Multiple Medal Winners
Other than Sedakova, several other competitors won multiple medals.  For Russia, Olga Brusnikina, won gold in the duet and team routines. Japan had two multiple winners; Miya Tachibana won bronze in the solo, and silver with partner Miho Takeda in both the duet and team competitions.  For France Virginie Dedieu won a silver in the solo competition, and a bronze in the duet.

References

 
1998 World Aquatics Championships
1998 in synchronized swimming
Synchronised swimming at the World Aquatics Championships